Niina Petrõkina (born 14 August 2004) is an Estonian figure skater. She is the 2021 CS Warsaw Cup silver medalist, the 2021 CS Cup of Austria and 2021 CS Golden Spin of Zagreb bronze medalist, and a two-time Estonian national champion (2022, 2023). She has competed in the final segment at three ISU Championships, finishing in the top ten at the 2022 Europeans and 2022 Junior Worlds.

Personal life 
Petrõkina was born on 14 August 2004 in Tallinn, Estonia. As of 2021, she is a high school student. She speaks Russian and Estonian.

Career

Early years 
Petrõkina began learning how to skate in 2008 at the age of four. She began competing internationally for Estonia during the 2012–13 season at the Chicks level before competing as a basic and advanced novice. She made her international junior debut at the Haabersti Cup in October 2017.

2018–19 season: Junior Grand Prix debut 
Petrõkina made her Junior Grand Prix debut in November at the 2018 JGP Czech Republic, where she finished eleventh. She did not receive a second JGP assignment that season. She earned the bronze medals in the junior women's events at the 2018 Volvo Open Cup and 2018 Tallinn Trophy before placing fourth at the 2019 Estonian Championships. She later took the titles at four more junior internationals in the new year.

2019–20 season 
Petrõkina received two Junior Grand Prix assignments to open her season. Competing in Latvia, she placed sixth, and in Poland, tenth. She defended her junior title at the 2019 Tallinn Trophy and placed second at the 2019 Ice Star in the lead up to the 2020 Estonian Championships, where she won the silver medal behind Eva-Lotta Kiibus. 

In March 2020, Petrõkina competed at her first World Junior Championships, held at home in Tallinn. She failed to advance to the free skate, placing thirty-third.

2020–21 season 
Petrõkina missed the entirety of the season due to illness.

2021–22 season: Senior international debut 
Petrõkina opened her season on the Junior Grand Prix at the second installment of the 2021 JGP France. She placed seventh at the event and followed that performance up with a fourth-place finish at the 2021 JGP Austria, a career-best placement for her on the Junior Grand Prix circuit.

In November, Petrõkina made her senior international debut at her first Challenger series event, the 2021 CS Cup of Austria, where she won the bronze medal behind Japanese skater Wakaba Higuchi, and South Korea's Park Yeon-jeong. She also finished nearly forty points ahead of domestic rival and reigning Estonian champion Eva-Lotta Kiibus. She received a second Challenger assignment the following weekend, the 2021 CS Warsaw Cup, where she won the silver medal behind Russian competitor Maiia Khromykh and ahead of Ekaterina Kurakova of Poland. In December, Petrõkina won her first senior national title at the 2022 Estonian Championships over Kiibus. After winning her national title, Petrõkina competed at a third Challenger assignment, the 2021 CS Golden Spin of Zagreb. She placed fourth in the short program but advanced into bronze medal position by winning the free skate ahead of gold medalist Anastasiia Gubanova and silver medalist Amber Glenn.

Due to Petrõkina's national results, she qualified as the top-seeded Estonian woman to one of two berths for her country at the 2022 European Championships in Tallinn. She finished eighth, also defeating Kiibus for a third time that season, but despite this, she was not named to the Estonian Olympic team due to the national federation's criteria for assigning the spot. Petrõkina expressed excitement at competing at the European championships alongside top athletes in the sport. Notably, the event was held in the same arena as the 2020 World Junior Championships, where she had failed to qualify for the free skate. 

Shortly after the conclusion of the 2022 Winter Olympics, Russia invaded Ukraine. As a result, the International Skating Union banned all Russian athletes from competing at ISU championships. As Russian women had dominated international figure skating in recent years, this had a significant impact on the field. Petrõkina then made her World Championship debut, finishing sixteenth. Due to both the invasion and the Omicron variant, the World Junior Championships could not be held as scheduled in Sofia in early March, and were rescheduled for mid-April in Tallinn, the third ISU championship held there in that year. Petrõkina was sixth in the short program with a clean skate. She struggled in the free skate, dropping to ninth overall.

2022–23 season 
Petrõkina began the new season at two Challenger events, with an eleventh-place finish at the 2022 CS Nebelhorn Trophy and a bronze medal at 2022 CS Budapest Trophy, the latter her third Challenger medal. She was then invited to make her Grand Prix debut at the 2022 Skate Canada International, where she finished in sixth place. She finished the Grand Prix by coming seventh at the 2022 NHK Trophy.

After winning her second consecutive Estonian national title, Petrõkina competed at the 2023 European Championships in Espoo. She was seventh in the short program, though less than a point back of fifth. She rose to sixth after the free skate, and cried "tears of relief" at the result. Hers was the highest-ever placement for an Estonian woman at the European Championships. 

Petrõkina finished twelfth at the 2023 World Junior Championships.

Programs

Competitive highlights 
GP: Grand Prix Series; CS: Challenger Series; JGP: Junior Grand Prix.

Detailed results 
Small medals for short and free programs awarded only at ISU Championships. Personal bests highlighted in bold.

Senior results

Junior results

References

External links 
 

2004 births
Living people

Estonian female single skaters

Figure skaters from Tallinn
Estonian people of Russian descent